Pauwau or Pau wau may refer to:

 Pow wow, a gathering of North American native peoples
 Seel (Pokémon), a fictional species of Pokémon